Eileen Doris Rubery CB QHP FRCR FFPHM FRCPath (née McDonnell, born 16 May 1943) is a British academic who has worked in such diverse fields as medical research (at one point Senior Principal Medical Officer of the Department of Health), business and management studies, and presently, art history and history.

She was appointed CB in 1998.

She is a fellow of Girton College, Cambridge.

References 

1943 births
Living people
Companions of the Order of the Bath
Fellows of Girton College, Cambridge
Administrators in the National Health Service